Alice Turner Curtis (September 6, 1860 – July 10, 1958) was an American writer of juvenile historical fiction. She was probably best remembered by young readers of her day for The Little Maid's Historical Series (which comprises twenty-four books, starting with A Little Maid of Province Town). She has written at least sixty published books (most of them were originally published by The Penn Publishing Company).

Family
Alice Turner was born in Sullivan, Maine, the youngest known child of John Vinal Turner (June 6, 1802 – December 31, 1886) and Susan Ann Spear (4 January 1824 – 26/27 May 1901). Her father and another relative (George D. Turner) were sailmakers. Reverend Charles R. Tenney married Alice to Irving Curtis (January 18, 1837 – November 18, 1910) on May 20, 1895, in Boston, Massachusetts, where they both resided at the time. She was listed in Daughters of the American Revolution, much as her father's father, Fobes Turner (October 26, 1766 – 1846) was listed in Sons of the American Revolution. She had at least three siblings (John V., Anna or Annie S., and Ella F., who were also born in Sullivan, Maine). She dedicated Marjorie in the Sunny South to her sister, Anna (see the front matter of the book itself).

Life and education
She went to public schools in Maine and Massachusetts, but was also tutored privately. She was a Republican in 1936, and a supporter of women's suffrage. She was a member of D.A.R. (Tea Party Chapter, Boston), and the New England Women's Club, Boston. She was also a salaried contributor to Youth's Companion. She enjoyed reading, walking, and housekeeping for recreation. Although her earliest-known book (Marjorie's Way) was published in 1904, she had been in the literary profession by 1895 according to her marriage record.

Works

The Little Maids historical series
A Little Maid of Province Town (AKA Anne Nelson, Little Maid of Provincetown), 1910, 1913, 1916, 1922, 1925, 1954, 1997
A Little Maid of Massachusetts Colony, 1914, 1915, 1916, 1924, 1951, 1996
A Little Maid of Narragansett Bay, 1915, 1920, 1925, 1928, 1954, 1998
A Little Maid of Bunker Hill, 1916, 1920, 1927, 1929, 1952
A Little Maid of Ticonderoga, 1917, 1924, 1927, 1954, 1996
A Little Maid of Old Connecticut, 1918, 1920, 1953, 1996
A Little Maid of Old Philadelphia, 1919, 1921, 1955, 1996
A Little Maid of Old Maine, 1920, 1926, 1953, 1999
A Little Maid of Old New York, 1921, 1924, 1951, 1996
A Little Maid of Virginia, 1922, 1925, 1951, 1953, 1998
A Little Maid of Maryland, 1923, 1926, 1952, 1997
A Little Maid of Mohawk Valley, 1924, 1928, 1944, 1952, 1999
A Little Maid of Monmouth, 1925, 1953
A Little Maid of Nantucket, 1926, 1929, 1950
A Little Maid of Vermont, 1927, 1948, 1952
A Little Maid of New Hampshire, 1928, 1954
A Little Maid of South Carolina, 1929, 1952
A Little Maid of New Orleans, 1930, 1949
A Little Maid of Fort Pitt, 1931, 1953
A Little Maid of Lexington, 1932, 1955
A Little Maid of Boston, 1933, 1954
A Little Maid of Newport, 1935, 1955
A Little Maid of Quebec, 1936, 1954, 1955
A Little Maid of Valley Forge, 1937, 1951

The Yankee Girl Civil War Stories series
A Yankee Girl at Fort Sumter, 1920
A Yankee Girl at Bull Run, 1921
A Yankee Girl at Shiloh, 1922, 2002
A Yankee Girl at Antieam, 1923
A Yankee Girl at Gettysburg (AKA Kathleen), 1925
A Yankee Girl at Vicksburg, 1926
A Yankee Girl at Hampton Roads, 1927
A Yankee Girl at Lookout Mountain, 1928
A Yankee Girl at the Battle of the Wilderness, 1929
A Yankee Girl at Richmond, 1930

Frontier Girl series
A Frontier Girl of Virginia, 1929
A Frontier Girl of Massachusetts, 1930
A Frontier Girl of New York, 1931
A Frontier Girl of Chesapeake Bay, 1934
A Frontier Girl of Pennsylvania, 1937

Grandpa's Little Girls series
Grandpa's Little Girls, 1907
Grandpa's Little Girls at School, 1908
Grandpa's Little Girls and Their Friends, 1909
Grandpa's Little Girls House-boat Party, 1909, 1910
Grandpa's Little Girls and Miss Abitha, 1911
Grandpa's Little Girls Grown Up, 1912, 1920

The Little Heroine series
A Little Heroine of Illinois, 1908
The Little Heroine at School, 1909

The Little Runnaways series
The Little Runnaways, 1905, 1906
The Little Runnaways and Mother, 1913
The Little Runnaways at Orchard House, 1914, 1920
The Little Runnaways at Home, 1916

The Marjorie series
Marjorie's Way, 1904, 1905
Marjorie's Schooldays, 1911, 1914, 1926
Marjorie in the Sunny South, 1912
Marjorie on Beacon Hill, 1913, 1926

Unknown series title
Although only one book in this series is known to be written by Alice Turner Curtis, she did write the first of them (The Story of Cotton). These are novels, much as most of her other works.
The Story of Cotton, 1911, by Alice Turner Curtis
The Story of Gold and Silver, 1920, by Elizabeth Ida Samuel
The Story of Lumber, 1920, by Sara Ware Bassett
The Story of Wool, 1913, 1917, by Sara Ware Bassett
The Story of Iron, 1920, by Elizabeth Ida Samuel
The Story of Leather, 1915, 1917, by Sara Ware Bassett
The Story of Glass, 1916, by Sara Ware Bassett
The Story of Sugar, by 1920, 1926, by Sara Ware Bassett
The Story of Silk, 1920, by Sara Ware Bassett
The Story of Porcelain, 1919, by Sara Ware Bassett
The Story of Wheat (unknown author and publication date)
The Story of Linen (unknown author and publication date)

Other
The Outdoor Chums, 1913
Miss Ann and Jimmy, 1916
Ted Gilman, 1916
A Challenge to Adventure, 1919
Stories of the Civil War (mentioned at the beginning of A Little Maid of Virginia, 1922)
She also wrote short stories in Century Magazine, by 1915

References

External links

 
 
 Works by or about Alice Turner Curtis at Google Books
 

1860 births
1958 deaths
20th-century American novelists
American children's writers
Writers from Maine
Writers from Boston
American women children's writers
American women novelists
20th-century American women writers
Burials at Southside Cemetery, Skowhegan
Novelists from Maine
Novelists from Massachusetts